The 1969–70 NBA season was the Hawks' 21st season in the NBA and second season in the city of Atlanta.

Draft picks

Roster

Regular season

Season standings

Record vs. opponents

Game log

|- align="center" bgcolor="ccffcc"
| 1 || October 15 || Seattle || 124–119 || Jim Davis (31)|| Alexander Memorial Coliseum || 1–0
|- align="center" bgcolor="ccffcc"
| 2 || October 18 || Phoenix || 121–116 || Joe Caldwell (26) || Alexander Memorial Coliseum || 2–0
|- align="center" bgcolor="ffcccc"
| 3 || October 22 || San Francisco || 93–94 || Lou Hudson (25) || Alexander Memorial Coliseum || 2–1
|- align="center" bgcolor="ccffcc"
| 4 || October 24 || Boston || 122–110 || Lou Hudson (28) || Boston Garden || 3–1
|- align="center" bgcolor="ffcccc"
| 5 || October 25 || Detroit || 104–125 || Lou Hudson (31) || Alexander Memorial Coliseum || 3–2
|- align="center" bgcolor="ffcccc"
| 6 || October 28 || New York || 104–128 || Don Ohl (19) || Madison Square Garden || 3–3
|- align="center" bgcolor="ccffcc"
| 7 || October 29 || San Diego || 117–113 || Lou Hudson (29) || Alexander Memorial Coliseum || 4–3
|-

|- align="center" bgcolor="ccffcc"
|  8|| November 1 || Baltimore || 140–137 || Lou Hudson (41) || Baltimore Civic Center || 5–3
|- align="center" bgcolor="ccffcc"
|  9|| November 2 || Seattle || 125–113 || Walt Hazzard (23) || Alexander Memorial Coliseum || 6–3
|- align="center" bgcolor="ccffcc"
|  10|| November 5 || Boston || 128–121 || Lou Hudson (37) || Alexander Memorial Coliseum || 7–3
|- align="center" bgcolor="ccffcc"
|  11|| November 6 || Chicago || 142–137 || Lou Hudson (30) || Chicago Stadium || 8–3
|- align="center" bgcolor="ccffcc"
|  12|| November 8 || San Francisco || 106–93 || Bill Bridges (24) || Alexander Memorial Coliseum || 9–3
|- align="center" bgcolor="ccffcc"
|  13|| November 10 || Chicago || 133–132 || Lou Hudson (52) || Auburn, AL || 10–3
|- align="center" bgcolor="ccffcc"
|  14|| November 11 || Philadelphia || 124–107 || Lou Hudson (30) || Alexander Memorial Coliseum || 11–3
|- align="center" bgcolor="ccffcc"
|  15|| November 14 || San Francisco || 120–109 || Lou Hudson (38) || Oakland–Alameda County Coliseum Arena || 12–3
|- align="center" bgcolor="ffcccc"
|  16|| November 15 || San Diego || 118–133 || Butch Beard (31) || San Diego Sports Arena || 12–4
|- align="center" bgcolor="ffcccc"
|  17|| November 16 || Phoenix || 118–139 || Jim Davis (26) || Albuquerque, New Mexico || 12–5
|- align="center" bgcolor="ccffcc"
|  18|| November 19 || Seattle || 137–116 || Joe Caldwell (34) || Seattle Center Coliseum || 13–5
|- align="center" bgcolor="ccffcc"
|  19|| November 21 || Detroit || 118–106 || Bill Bridges (27) || Cobo Arena || 14–5
|- align="center" bgcolor="ffcccc"
|  20|| November 22 || Philadelphia || 116–132 || Lou Hudson (25) || Alexander Memorial Coliseum || 14–6
|- align="center" bgcolor="ffcccc"
|  21|| November 25 || Milwaukee || 115–130 || Jim Davis (30) || St. Louis, Missouri || 14–7
|- align="center" bgcolor="ffcccc"
|  22|| November 26 || New York || 108–138 || Joe Caldwell (17) || Alexander Memorial Coliseum || 14–8
|- align="center" bgcolor="ccffcc"
|  23|| November 28 || Boston || 130–105 || Joe Caldwell (34) || Boston Garden || 15–8
|- align="center" bgcolor="ccffcc"
|  24|| November 29 || Cincinnati || 128–111 || Lou Hudson (32) || Boston Garden || 16–8
|-

|- align="center" bgcolor="ccffcc"
|  25|| December 4 || Seattle || 119–111 || Walt Hazzard (32) || Alexander Memorial Coliseum || 17–8
|- align="center" bgcolor="ffcccc"
|  26|| December 5 || Cincinnati || 127–156 || Lou Hudson (31) || Cincinnati Gardens || 17–9
|- align="center" bgcolor="ccffcc"
|  27|| December 7 || L.A. Lakers || 104–103 || Walt Hazzard (27) || The Forum || 18–9
|- align="center" bgcolor="ccffcc"
|  28|| December 7 || San Francisco || 117–115 || Lou Hudson (31) || Salt Lake City, UT || 19–9
|- align="center" bgcolor="ffcccc"
|  29|| December 10 || San Diego || 107–126 || Jim Davis (24) || San Diego Sports Arena || 19–10
|- align="center" bgcolor="ccffcc"
|  30|| December 12 || L.A. Lakers || 121–107 || Lou Hudson (25) || Alexander Memorial Coliseum || 20–10
|- align="center" bgcolor="ffcccc"
|  31|| December 13 || Milwaukee || 100–121 || Bill Bridges (24) || Alexander Memorial Coliseum || 20–11
|- align="center" bgcolor="ccffcc"
|  32|| December 16 || New York || 125–124 || Joe Caldwell (28) || Madison Square Garden || 21–11
|- align="center" bgcolor="ffcccc"
|  33|| December 17 || Baltimore || 133–138 || Lou Hudson (44) || Alexander Memorial Coliseum || 21–12
|- align="center" bgcolor="ffcccc"
|  34|| December 18 || Chicago || 112–114 || Lou Hudson (25) || Kansas City, Kansas || 21–13
|- align="center" bgcolor="ccffcc"
|  35|| December 20 || Boston || 122–106 || Lou Hudson (29) || Alexander Memorial Coliseum || 22–13
|- align="center" bgcolor="ccffcc"
|  36|| December 21 || Chicago || 118–111 || Lou Hudson (31) || Alexander Memorial Coliseum || 23–13
|- align="center" bgcolor="ffcccc"
|  37|| December 26 || Cincinnati || 110–130 || Bill Bridges (24) || Cleveland, OH || 23–14
|- align="center" bgcolor="ccffcc"
|  38|| December 27 || Philadelphia || 112–107 || Joe Caldwell (31) || Alexander Memorial Coliseum || 24–14
|- align="center" bgcolor="ccffcc"
|  39|| December 29 || San Diego || 122–118 || Lou Hudson (29) || Alexander Memorial Coliseum || 25–14
|- align="center" bgcolor="ccffcc"
|  40|| December 31 || Baltimore || 122–111 || Lou Hudson (29) || Alexander Memorial Coliseum || 26–14
|-

|- align="center" bgcolor="ffcccc"
|  41|| January 2 || Philadelphia || 117–121 || Walt Hazzard (27) || The Spectrum || 26–15
|- align="center" bgcolor="ffcccc"
|  42|| January 3 || Cincinnati || 102–104 || Lou Hudson (25) || Alexander Memorial Coliseum || 26–16
|- align="center" bgcolor="ccffcc"
|  43|| January 4 || Milwaukee || 126–125 || Joe Caldwell (26) || Milwaukee Arena || 27–16
|- align="center" bgcolor="ccffcc"
|  44|| January 6 || Seattle || 101–97 || Bill Bridges (26) || Alexander Memorial Coliseum || 28–16
|- align="center" bgcolor="ccffcc"
|  45|| January 7 || Boston || 112–106 || Bill Bridges (30) || Boston Garden || 29–16
|- align="center" bgcolor="ffcccc"
|  46|| January 9 || L.A. Lakers || 112–127 || Lou Hudson (30) || Alexander Memorial Coliseum || 29–17
|- align="center" bgcolor="ffcccc"
|  47|| January 10 || Baltimore || 109–130 || Lou Hudson (22) || Baltimore Civic Center || 29–18
|- align="center" bgcolor="ffcccc"
|  48|| January 12 || Detroit || 113–100 || Bill Bridges (23) || Memphis, Tennessee || 29–19
|- align="center" bgcolor="ffcccc"
|  49|| January 13 || Philadelphia || 105–136 || Butch Beard (27) || The Spectrum || 29–20
|- align="center" bgcolor="ffcccc"
|  50|| January 14 || San Francisco || 101–103 || Joe Caldwell (33) || Alexander Memorial Coliseum || 29–21
|- align="center" bgcolor="ccffcc"
|  51|| January 16 || Cincinnati || 117–100 || Lou Hudson (33) || Columbia, South Carolina || 30–21
|- align="center" bgcolor="ccffcc"
|  52|| January 18 || Chicago || 125–107 || Walt Hazzard (40) || Alexander Memorial Coliseum || 31–21
|- align="center" bgcolor="ffcccc"
|  53|| January 25 || Milwaukee || 116–131 || Joe Caldwell (22) || Alexander Memorial Coliseum || 31–22
|- align="center" bgcolor="ccffcc"
|  54|| January 26 || San Francisco || 131–104 || Lou Hudson (30) || Oakland–Alameda County Coliseum Arena || 32–22
|- align="center" bgcolor="ffcccc"
|  55|| January 28 || Seattle || 119–120 || Bill Bridges (24) || Seattle Center Coliseum || 32–23
|- align="center" bgcolor="ffcccc"
|  56|| January 29 || Phoenix || 102–111 || Joe Caldwell (29) || Arizona Veterans Memorial Coliseum || 32–24
|- align="center" bgcolor="ffcccc"
|  57|| January 30 || L.A. Lakers || 87–102 || Gary Gregor (22) || The Forum || 32–25
|-

|- align="center" bgcolor="ffcccc"
|  58|| February 1 || Baltimore || 124–133 || Lou Hudson (45) || Alexander Memorial Coliseum || 32–26
|- align="center" bgcolor="ccffcc"
|  59|| February 2 || Detroit || 125–121 || Lou Hudson (42) || Greenville, South Carolina || 33–26
|- align="center" bgcolor="ccffcc"
|  60|| February 4 || New York || 111–96 || Lou Hudson (36) || Alexander Memorial Coliseum || 34–26
|- align="center" bgcolor="ccffcc"
|  61|| February 6 || Chicago || 104–93 || Lou Hudson (28) || Alexander Memorial Coliseum || 35–26
|- align="center" bgcolor="ffcccc"
|  62|| February 8 || Chicago || 107–117 || Joe Caldwell (24) || Chicago Stadium || 35–27
|- align="center" bgcolor="ffcccc"
|  63|| February 10 || San Francisco || 104–113 || Joe Caldwell (20) || Oakland–Alameda County Coliseum Arena || 35–28
|- align="center" bgcolor="ccffcc"
|  64|| February 11 || San Diego || 155–131 || Walt Hazzard (38) || San Diego Sports Arena || 36–28
|- align="center" bgcolor="ffcccc"
|  65|| February 12 || L.A. Lakers || 114–136 || Walt Bellamy (31) || The Forum || 36–29
|- align="center" bgcolor="ccffcc"
|  66|| February 15 || Boston || 146–125 || Lou Hudson (36) || Alexander Memorial Coliseum || 37–29
|- align="center" bgcolor="ccffcc"
|  67|| February 18 || Cincinnati || 139–125 || Joe Caldwell (41) || Memphis, Tennessee || 38–29
|- align="center" bgcolor="ccffcc"
|  68|| February 21 || New York || 122–106 || Walt Hazzard (27) || Madison Square Garden || 39–29
|- align="center" bgcolor="ffcccc"
|  69|| February 22 || Detroit || 114–116 || Joe Caldwell (34) || Alexander Memorial Coliseum || 39–30
|- align="center" bgcolor="ccffcc"
|  70|| February 24 || L.A. Lakers || 118–106 || Joe Caldwell (38) || The Forum || 40–30
|- align="center" bgcolor="ffcccc"
|  71|| February 25 || Seattle || 112–120 || Lou Hudson (32) || Seattle Center Coliseum || 40–31
|- align="center" bgcolor="ffcccc"
|  72|| February 27 || Baltimore || 107–114 || Joe Caldwell (22) || Baltimore Civic Center || 40–32
|-

|- align="center" bgcolor="ffcccc"
|  73|| March 1 || Phoenix || 98–109 || Lou Hudson (30) || Alexander Memorial Coliseum || 40–33
|- align="center" bgcolor="ccffcc"
|  74|| March 3 || L.A. Lakers || 101–93 || Lou Hudson (31) || Alexander Memorial Coliseum || 41–33
|- align="center" bgcolor="ccffcc"
|  75|| March 5 || Milwaukee || 126–117 || Joe Caldwell (29) || Milwaukee Arena || 42–33
|- align="center" bgcolor="ffcccc"
|  76|| March 8 || Phoenix || 119–130 || Walt Bellamy (31) || Arizona Veterans Memorial Coliseum || 42–34
|- align="center" bgcolor="ccffcc"
|  77|| March 10 || Milwaukee || 140–127 || Lou Hudson (36) || Alexander Memorial Coliseum || 43–34
|- align="center" bgcolor="ccffcc"
|  78|| March 11 || San Diego || 122–121 || Lou Hudson (48) || Alexander Memorial Coliseum || 44–34
|- align="center" bgcolor="ccffcc"
|  79|| March 15 || Phoenix || 126–111 || Walt Hazzard (36) || Alexander Memorial Coliseum || 45–34
|- align="center" bgcolor="ccffcc"
|  80|| March 17 || Philadelphia || 128–125 || Joe Caldwell (45) || The Spectrum || 46–34
|- align="center" bgcolor="ccffcc"
|  81|| March 20 || New York || 110–102 || Lou Hudson (38) || Alexander Memorial Coliseum || 47–34
|- align="center" bgcolor="ccffcc"
|  82|| March 22 || Detroit || 130–126 || Joe Caldwell (25) || Cobo Arena || 48–34
|-
|-

 The 11/6/1969 game at Chicago Stadium got suspended, and was completed on 2/8/1970.

Playoffs

|- align="center" bgcolor="#ccffcc"
| 1
| March 25
| Chicago
| W 129–111
| Joe Caldwell (39)
| Bill Bridges (15)
| Walt Hazzard (10)
| Alexander Memorial Coliseum6,427
| 1–0
|- align="center" bgcolor="#ccffcc"
| 2
| March 28
| Chicago
| W 124–104
| Joe Caldwell (23)
| Walt Bellamy (14)
| Walt Hazzard (13)
| Alexander Memorial Coliseum7,195
| 2–0
|- align="center" bgcolor="#ccffcc"
| 3
| March 31
| @ Chicago
| W 106–101
| Lou Hudson (30)
| Walt Bellamy (17)
| Walt Hazzard (8)
| Chicago Stadium8,898
| 3–0
|- align="center" bgcolor="#ffcccc"
| 4
| April 3
| @ Chicago
| L 120–131
| Joe Caldwell (38)
| Bill Bridges (25)
| Walt Hazzard (9)
| Chicago Stadium7,584
| 3–1
|- align="center" bgcolor="#ccffcc"
| 5
| April 5
| Chicago
| W 113–107
| Joe Caldwell (24)
| Walt Bellamy (23)
| Bill Bridges (4)
| Alexander Memorial Coliseum4,966
| 4–1
|-

|- align="center" bgcolor="#ffcccc"
| 1
| April 12
| Los Angeles
| L 115–119
| Walt Hazzard (29)
| Walt Bellamy (21)
| Lou Hudson (8)
| Alexander Memorial Coliseum7,197
| 0–1
|- align="center" bgcolor="#ffcccc"
| 2
| April 14
| Los Angeles
| L 94–105
| Walt Bellamy (20)
| Bill Bridges (19)
| Joe Caldwell (7)
| Alexander Memorial Coliseum7,197
| 0–2
|- align="center" bgcolor="#ffcccc"
| 3
| April 17
| @ Los Angeles
| L 114–115 (OT)
| Hudson, Beard (22)
| Bill Bridges (19)
| Lou Hudson (6)
| The Forum17,183
| 0–3
|- align="center" bgcolor="#ffcccc"
| 4
| April 19
| @ Los Angeles
| L 114–133
| Richie Guerin (31)
| Bill Bridges (18)
| Caldwell, Hudson (5)
| The Forum17,410
| 0–4
|-

Awards and records

Awards
Lou Hudson, All-NBA Second Team
Bill Bridges, NBA All-Defensive Second Team
Joe Caldwell, NBA All-Defensive Second Team

References

Atlanta Hawks seasons
Atlanta
Atlanta
Atlanta